"Only" is a song by American industrial rock band Nine Inch Nails. It was released as the second single from Nine Inch Nails' fourth album, With Teeth. "Only" reached number one on the Billboard Modern Rock chart, where it stayed for seven weeks. It is the second successful release that Nine Inch Nails has had in the UK, peaking at number 20.

The song is regarded as a fan favorite and has been a staple of Nine Inch Nails live performances for several years, placed by setlist.fm as their 20th most played song live.

Background

Singer Trent Reznor said the song is about the music business clashing with his artistic desires.

Recording and release
"Only" was the last song completed for With Teeth.

Like the previous single, "The Hand That Feeds", "Only" was only widely released in Europe. European releases include a CD, a DVD, and a 9" vinyl. The only United States release is a vinyl format—a remix record with mixes from Richard X and El-P.

Like "The Hand That Feeds", "Only" was released as a GarageBand multitrack file, as well as for DigiDesign Pro Tools, Ableton Live, and Sony ACID Pro. A fan remix community page was set up on MySpace.

Music
"Only" has been labeled as dance-rock, dance-punk, new wave revival and synth-pop.

Music video

The music video for "Only", directed by David Fincher and relying almost entirely on CGI created by Digital Domain, shows various objects in an executive's office, such as Pin Art, Newton's Cradle and laptop screen saver coming to life with the propulsion of the song and was released on July 12, 2005, at NIN.com.

The main focus is Trent Reznor's face in the pinscreen that sits on the desk, which is the only way he appears in the video. The only non-CGI components of the video are a person's hand (Fincher's, who owns the PowerBook in the video) and the cars in the background.

Track listing

Charts

Weekly charts

Year-end charts

See also
2005 in music

References

Nine Inch Nails songs
2005 singles
Dance-punk songs
Dance-rock songs
Music videos directed by David Fincher
American new wave songs
Song recordings produced by Alan Moulder
Song recordings produced by Trent Reznor
Songs written by Trent Reznor
American synth-pop songs
Solipsism